Robert Aske may refer to:

Robert Aske (political leader) (1500–1537), leader of the Pilgrimage of Grace, against the dissolution of the monasteries
Robert Aske (merchant) (1619–1689), Merchant and Member of the Worshipful Company of Haberdashers, founder of the Haberdashers' Aske's Boys' School
Sir Robert Aske, 1st Baronet (1872–1954), British Liberal politician, MP 1923–1924, 1929–1945